Visitors to Israel must obtain a visa from one of the Israeli diplomatic missions unless they come from one of the visa exempt countries. All visitors must hold a passport that is valid for 6 months after the date of departure from Israel.

Visa policy map

Visa exemption
Holders of normal passports of the following 101 jurisdictions do not require a visa for Israel for a maximum stay of 3 months for tourism:

1 – German citizens born before January 1, 1928 need a visa which will be issued for free if one was not a member of the Nazi party or involved in crimes committed during the time of the Nazi Germany.
2 – visa exemption does not apply to official passport holders, e.g. American government officials. Russian official passport holders require confirmation from the Israeli government.

3 - Only for biometric passport

Holders of Palestinian Authority passports can obtain their visa on arrival in order to continue their journey to the Palestinian territories. Holders of a confirmation issued by the Israeli Ministry of Interior, traveling in a group of 10 or more, can obtain a visa on arrival (not applicable to nationals of Jordan).

A visa waiver agreement was signed with Samoa in March 2019 and it is yet to be implemented.

Reciprocity

Israeli citizens can enter visa free or receive a free visa on arrival to all of the countries that Israel gives visa free access to except Australia and the United States.

In return Israel grants visa free access to most countries that gives Israelis visa free access but Israel requires a visa for passports from Bosnia and Herzegovina, Jordan (with confirmation), Kazakhstan, Kosovo, Kyrgyzstan, Maldives, Nicaragua, Samoa, Seychelles, Thailand, Turkey, and Uzbekistan

Non-ordinary passports

Holders of diplomatic and service category passports of Azerbaijan, Bahrain, Bosnia and Herzegovina, Burkina Faso, China, Republic of the Congo, Côte d'Ivoire, Gabon, Gambia, Guyana, India, Madagascar, Morocco, Niger, Sierra Leone, Thailand, Togo, and Turkey and of diplomatic passports of Kenya, Nicaragua, Rwanda and Vietnam do not require a visa.

Holders of diplomatic or service category passports of Australia, Belarus, Dominica, Russia, Saint Kitts and Nevis, South Africa, Taiwan and United States require a visa. Russian diplomatic and service category passports require confirmation from the government before a visa can be issued.

The visa-free agreement for diplomatic and special passports with Morocco entered into force at the beginning of 2022.

History 
Israel and Democratic Republic of the Congo signed visa exemption agreement for diplomatic and service passports on 19 November 1963 and 14 April 1964, came into force on 28 July 1964. Date of cancellation is unknown. Israel and Liberia signed visa exemption agreement for diplomatic and service passports on 17 July and 3 August 1961, came into force on 1 November 1961. Date of cancellation is unknown. Israel and Tanganyika signed visa exemption agreement for diplomatic and service passports on 16 and 17 September 1963, came into force on 17 September 1963. Date of cancellation is unknown. Israel and Bolivia signed visa exemption agreement for diplomatic and service passports on 10 and 16 August 1972, came into force on 16 October 1972. Date of cancellation is unknown. Israel and Dominica signed visa exemptions for diplomatic and official passport holders in December 1987. Date of cancellation is unknown.

Israeli passport stamps

Visitors with a passport stamp from Israel are not allowed to enter a number of countries because of the Arab League boycott of Israel. Some countries, e.g. Austria, Canada, Germany, Russia, UK and the USA allow their citizens to hold two or more passports of their country to circumvent such travel restrictions, but some countries (including Austria and Germany) also restrict or forbid the holding of passports of two countries, i.e. dual citizenship. However for the past several years, stamps are no longer used at Ben Gurion airport (since January 15, 2013) and also land border crossings with Jordan. Instead, entry and departure records are printed on small slips of paper, which include the name of the traveller, the photo read from the epassport, the date, the visa status, and other details. The slips also include a 2D barcode which is used as a Gate Pass to pass through the gate out of the passport control hall.

Confirmation required 
Holders of national and official passports of the following countries require a confirmation from the Israeli Foreign Ministry before a tourist visa is issued.

Visitor statistics
Most visitors arriving to Israel were from the following countries of nationality:

 *= 2018 data until September only.
 **=incomplete list

See also

Visa requirements for Israeli citizens
Israeli passport
Israeli identity card
Israeli permit system in the West Bank

References

External links

 Ministry of Foreign Affairs of Israel

Foreign relations of Israel
Israel
Israeli immigration law